Marcelite J. Harris (January 16, 1943 – September 7, 2018) was an American who became the first African-American female general officer of the United States Air Force.

Education and early career
Born Marcelite Jordan to Cecil O'Neal Jordan and Marcelite Terrill Jordan, in Houston, Texas, she graduated from Spelman College, earning her B.A. in speech and drama and completed
Officer Training School, Lackland Air Force Base, Texas, in 1965 and held a variety of assignments in the Air Force.

Harris’s career included many "firsts", including being the first female aircraft maintenance officer, one of the first two female air officers commanding at the United States Air Force Academy, and the Air Force’s first female Director of Maintenance. She served as a White House social aide during the Carter administration. Her service medals and decorations include the Bronze Star, the Presidential Unit Citation, and the Vietnam Service Medal.  Harris retired as a major general in 1997, the highest ranking female officer in the Air Force and the Nation’s highest ranking African-American woman in the Department of Defense.  Upon retirement from the Air Force, she served NASA as the Florida Site Director and Logistics Process Owner for United Space Alliance, the company managing the nation’s shuttle program.  Besides her Spelman B.A., she holds a B.S. in Business Management from the University of Maryland University College. In 1999, Harris was awarded an Honorary Doctorate Degree from Spelman College. She was a member of Delta Sigma Theta sorority.

Later career
Harris was a Treasurer of the Atlanta Branch of the National Association for the Advancement of Colored People and served as a Director on the Board of Peachtree Hope Charter School. On September 15th, 2010, she was appointed by President Barack Obama to serve as a member of the Board of Visitors for the United States Air Force Academy. The Board inquires into the morale, discipline, curriculum, instruction, physical equipment, fiscal affairs, academic methods and other matters relating to the Academy which the Board decides to consider.

Personal
Harris was married to Lt. Col. Maurice Harris. They had two children named Steven and  Tenecia. She was buried with full military honors on February 7, 2019, alongside her husband in Arlington National Cemetery.

Awards and decorations

Other achievements 

1990  - Woman of the Year, National Organization of Tuskegee Airmen, also listed in "Who's Who Among Black Americans", "Who's Who in America'' and "Who's Who Among American Business Women"
1990 - Outstanding Young Woman of America
1991 - Most Prestigious Individual, Dollars and Sense Magazine
1992 - Woman of Enterprise, Journal Recording Publishing Co., Oklahoma City
1995 - "Women of Distinction" Award, Thomas W. Anthony Chapter, Air Force Association
1995 - "Military African American Woman" for contributions to the Department of Defense, National Political Congress of Black Women, Inc.
1995 - "Black Woman of Courage," National Federation of Black Women Business Owners
1996 - Ellis Island Medal of Honor
2010 - "Trailblazer Award," Black Girls Rock Foundation

Effective dates of promotion

References

External links
"Major General Marcelite J. Harris", Women’s International Center; accessed August 21, 2006
Maj. Gen. Harris's career biography at US Air Force website
USAFA Board of Visitors, accessed 2/5/2011

1943 births
2018 deaths
African-American female military personnel

United States Air Force personnel of the Vietnam War

American female military personnel of the Vietnam War
Burials at Arlington National Cemetery
Female generals of the United States Air Force
Spelman College alumni
Military personnel from Houston
Recipients of the Legion of Merit
Delta Sigma Theta members
African-American women aviators
American women aviators
African-American aviators
Aviators from Texas
African-American United States Air Force personnel
African Americans in the Vietnam War